Awadeshwar Prasad Sinha (1907-1989) was an Indian politician.  He was elected to the Rajya Sabha, the upper house of the Parliament of India from Bihar for 4 terms from 1956 to 1976. He was elected from Muzaffarpur-East, Bihar in 1952 as a member of the Indian National Congress.

References

External links
Official biographical sketch in Parliament of India website

1907 births
1989 deaths
Indian National Congress politicians
Rajya Sabha members from Bihar
India MPs 1952–1957
Lok Sabha members from Bihar